Koňuš is a village and municipality in the Sobrance District in the Košice Region of east Slovakia.

History
In historical records the village was first mentioned in 1414.

Geography
The village lies at an altitude of 272 metres and covers an area of 23.236 km².
It has a population of about 350 people.

Culture
The village has a public library, a gym and a football pitch.

Genealogical resources

The records for genealogical research are available at the state archive "Statny Archiv in Presov, Slovakia"

 Roman Catholic church records (births/marriages/deaths): 1837–1931 (parish B)
 Greek Catholic church records (births/marriages/deaths): 1792–1903 (parish B)

See also
 List of municipalities and towns in Slovakia

External links
 
https://web.archive.org/web/20090412234949/http://www.statistics.sk/mosmis/eng/run.html
http://en.e-obce.sk/obec/konus/konus.html
Surnames of living people in Konus

Villages and municipalities in Sobrance District